Heros Racing (listed in some sources as Heroes Racing) was a Japanese motor racing team which competed briefly in Formula One in the  and  seasons. The team entered the 1976 and 1977 Japanese Grands Prix, each time with local driver Kazuyoshi Hoshino with a best result of 11th in 1977. The team also competed in two races in the 1978 European Formula Two Championship and in Japanese top formula racing.

Racing history

Formula One
The team's first F1 race was the 1976 Japanese Grand Prix, where Hoshino qualified 21st using an outdated Tyrrell 007. However, in the race, run in very wet conditions, he placed as high as third at one point before having to pit for replacement tyres. He was forced to retire on lap 28 (of 73), having used all his available tyres.

At the 1977 event, the team entered Hoshino in a Kojima KE009. He qualified 11th ahead of several works entries and also finished 11th, two laps down.

Formula Two
Heros Racing, with Hoshino driving, competed in two races in the 1978 European Formula Two Championship using a Nova-BMW, but did not score any points.

Japanese Top Formula racing
The Japanese Top Formula series (also known as the Super Formula Championship) was the premier single-seater domestic series run to various formulae over several years. In 1973, Motoharu Kurosawa, driving a March 722 for Heros Racing, won the inaugural series run to Formula 2000 rules. This success was repeated in 1976 with Noritake Takahara driving a Nova-BMW and again in 1977 with Hoshino using a Nova. In 1978, the series moved to Formula Two rules and Hoshino again took the title with a Nova-BMW.

In 1984, 1985 and 1986 the team achieved a further hat-trick of title wins with Japanese driver Satoru Nakajima in a March-Honda, and one further title in 1991 for Ukyo Katayama (Lola-Cosworth DFV) when the series had moved on to Formula 3000 regulations.

Complete Formula One results
(key)

References

External links
Stats at Motor Sport magazine database
Stats at laberezina.com (in French)

Formula One entrants
Japanese auto racing teams
Japanese Formula 3 Championship teams